Oumar Sako (born 4 May 1996) is an Ivorian footballer who plays as a defender for Bulgarian First League club Arda Kardzhali on loan from Austrian Football Bundesliga side LASK.

References

External links
 

1996 births
Living people
Ivorian footballers
Ivorian expatriate footballers
AS Tanda players
ASEC Mimosas players
Al Kharaitiyat SC players
PFC Beroe Stara Zagora players
Ligue 1 (Ivory Coast) players
Qatar Stars League players
First Professional Football League (Bulgaria) players
Expatriate footballers in Qatar
Expatriate footballers in Bulgaria
Ivorian expatriate sportspeople in Qatar
Ivorian expatriate sportspeople in Bulgaria
Association football defenders